Girolamo Gatti (1682–1726) was an Italian painter of the Baroque period, active mainly in Bologna. He was a pupil of the painter Marcantonio Franceschini. He painted Mystical night of Saint Theresa with Saints Andrea Corsini and Ursula for the church of the Carmine in Medicina. He was a member of the Accademia Clementina.

References

1682 births
1726 deaths
17th-century Italian painters
Italian male painters
18th-century Italian painters
Painters from Bologna
Italian Baroque painters
18th-century Italian male artists